The 2014 Danish Cup Final was a football match that decided the winner of the 2013–14 Danish Cup. It was played on 15 May 2013 at 20:00 CEST.

Route to the final

Match

References 

Danish Cup Finals
Cup
May 2014 sports events in Europe
2014 in Copenhagen
Sports competitions in Copenhagen
Danish Cup Final 2014
Danish Cup Final 2014